Igor V. Minin (born March 22, 1960 in Novosibirsk Academytown, Russia), a Russian physicist, corresponding member of the Russian Academy of Metrology and a full professor of Physics at the Tomsk Polytechnic University. He became known for contribution to the creation of new directions in science: THz 3D Zone plate, mesoscale photonics, subwavelength structured light, including acoustics and surface plasmon.

Biography
He received his M.S. from Novosibirsk State University in 1982, and received his PhD degree of physics and mathematics on radiophysics, including quantum physics at St. Petersburg Electrotechnical Institute in 1986. At the same time, from 1981 to 1982 he part-time worked as the laboratory assistants at the Institute of Applied Physics (Novosibirsk, Academytown), founded by his father in 1966-a famous scientist Prof. Vladilen F. Minin.

In March 2004 defended his doctoral thesis (which were awarded in 2001 by the Ministry of Defence (Russia) for the best scientific work during 1997–2000) at the Novosibirsk State Technical University and received degrees of Doctor of Technical Sciences (Equivalent to Habilitation degree).

Based on his research Prof.I.V.Minin published several monographs, including "Diffractional Optics of Millimetre Waves", "Basic Principles of Fresnel Antenna Arrays" and later "Diffractive Optics and Nanophotonics: Resolution Below the Diffraction Limit” The biographical data of I.V.Minin were included in Marquis Who's Who in the Science and Engineering (2003). Almost all scientific work was carried out together with his brother (twins) Prof. Oleg V. Minin.

Due to the book, which were dedicated to the 40th anniversary of the Novosibirsk Institute of Applied Physics in April 2007, the FSB of Russia accused Oleg and his brother Igor of revealing state secrets sensitive information about projects at an institute that conducts research for the Ministry of Defence (Russia). This case was widely publicized, well-known scientists and human rights activists spoke out in defense of the physics brothers. FSB investigators dropped their case against brothers, and prosecutors in Novosibirsk issued a rare apology to the scientists in July 2007.

Since Perestroika he had been an invited professor at DaimlerChrysler AG, Doiche Aerospace, Technische Universitat Munchen (Germany), Harbin Institute of Technology, MMW  State Key Lab, Nanjing, Beijing Institute of Technology, Capital Normal University (China), Samsung Electronics (Korea), National University of Singapore, Universidad Technica Federico Santa Maria (Chile),  University of Helsinki (Finland) and many Institutes in different physical area.

Research
I.V. Minin are pioneer in the field of the effect of the acoustic jet. It has been demonstrated for the first time an existence of acoustic analogue of photonic jet phenomenon, called acoustic jet. 

Based on hypercumulation principles in application to young stellar objects and active galactic nucleus, to better understand of astrophysical jets, he made the pioneering investigations of pulse plasma jets produced by intense laser matter interactions.

I.V. Minin are the author or coauthor about 450 research publications including 22 monographs (12 in Russian, 9 in English and 1 in Chinese) and more than 150 patents. He is an editorial member of several international journals and international conferences chair.

Awards
 For the contribution to the theory of hypercumulation, I.V. Minin was awarded the medal of the Russian National Committee on Theoretical and Applied Mechanics of Russian Academy of Sciences named after Kh.A. Rakhmatulin in 2013.

 Russian medals named after V.I. Vernadsky and A. Nobel.

Selected papers
 Minin O.V. and Minin I.V. Diffractional Optics of Millimetre Waves, lOP Publisher, 2004. 396 p. 
 Minin I.V. and Minin O.V. Basic Principles of Fresnel Antenna Arrays, Springer, 2008.  
 Minin I.V. and Minin O.V. Diffractive Optics and Nanophotonics: Resolution Below the Diffraction Limit, Springer, 2016.  
 Minin V. F., Minin I.V. and Minin O.V. Computational Fluid Dynamics, (2011).

References

1960 births
Living people
Russian physicists
Novosibirsk State University alumni
Tomsk Polytechnic University alumni